In the NUTS (Nomenclature of Territorial Units for Statistics) codes of Romania (RO), the three levels are:

NUTS codes

RO1	Macroregion one (Macroregiunea Unu)
RO11	Nord-Vest
RO111	Bihor County
RO112	Bistrița-Năsăud County
RO113	Cluj County
RO114	Maramureș County
RO115	Satu Mare County
RO116	Sălaj County
RO12	Centru
RO121	Alba County
RO122	Brașov County
RO123	Covasna County
RO124	Harghita County
RO125	Mureș County
RO126	Sibiu County
RO2	Macroregion two (Macroregiunea doi)
RO21	Nord-Est
RO211	Bacău County
RO212	Botoșani County
RO213	Iași County
RO214	Neamț County
RO215	Suceava County
RO216	Vaslui County
RO22	Sud-Est
RO221	Brăila County
RO222	Buzău County
RO223	Constanța County
RO224	Galați County
RO225	Tulcea County
RO226	Vrancea County
RO3	Macroregion three (Macroregiunea trei)
RO31	Sud-Muntenia
RO311	Argeș County
RO312	Călărași County
RO313	Dâmbovița County
RO314	Giurgiu County
RO315	Ialomița County
RO316	Prahova County
RO317	Teleorman County
RO32	București-Ilfov
RO321	București
RO322	Ilfov County
RO4	Macroregion four (Macroregiunea patru)
RO41	Sud-Vest Oltenia
RO411	Dolj County
RO412	Gorj County
RO413	Mehedinți County
RO414	Olt County
RO415	Vâlcea County
RO42	Vest
RO421	Arad County
RO422	Caraș-Severin County
RO423	Hunedoara County
RO424	Timiș County

In the 2003 version, the codes were as follows:
RO0    Romania
RO01 Nord-Est
RO011 Bacău County
RO012 Botoșani County
RO013 Iași County
RO014 Neamț County
RO015 Suceava County
RO016 Vaslui County
RO02 Sud-Est
RO021 Brăila County
RO022 Buzău County
RO023 Constanța County
RO024 Galați County
RO025 Tulcea County
RO026 Vrancea County
RO03 Sud-Muntenia
RO031 Argeș County
RO032 Călărași County
RO033 Dâmbovița County
RO034 Giurgiu County
RO035 Ialomița County
RO036 Prahova County
RO037 Teleorman County
RO04 Sud-Vest Oltenia
RO041 Dolj County
RO042 Gorj County
RO043 Mehedinți County
RO044 Olt County
RO045 Vâlcea County
RO05 Vest
RO051 Arad County
RO052 Caraș-Severin County
RO053 Hunedoara County
RO054 Timiș County
RO06 Nord-Vest
RO061 Bihor County
RO062 Bistrița-Năsăud County
RO063 Cluj County
RO064 Maramureș County
RO065 Satu Mare County
RO066 Sălaj County
RO07 Centru
RO071 Alba County
RO072 Brașov County
RO073 Covasna County
RO074 Harghita County
RO075 Mureș County
RO076 Sibiu County
RO08 București-Ilfov
RO081 București
RO082 Ilfov County

Local administrative units

Below the NUTS levels, the two LAU (Local Administrative Units) levels are:

The LAU codes of Romania can be downloaded here: ''

See also
List of Romanian regions by Human Development Index
Subdivisions of Romania
 ISO 3166-2 codes of Romania
 FIPS region codes of Romania

Sources
 Hierarchical list of the Nomenclature of territorial units for statistics - NUTS and the Statistical regions of Europe
 Overview map of EU Countries - NUTS level 1
 ROMÂNIA - NUTS level 2
 ROMÂNIA - NUTS level 3
 Correspondence between the NUTS levels and the national administrative units
 List of current NUTS codes
 Download current NUTS codes (ODS format)
 Counties of Romania, Statoids.com

Romania
Nuts